HMS Saintes was a 1942  fleet destroyer of the Royal Navy (RN). She and 15 sister ships being ordered under the 1942 defence estimates. The ship was named after the Battle of the Saintes, a Royal Navy victory over a French fleet intending to invade Jamaica in 1782. So far she has been the only ship of the Royal Navy to bear the name. Saintes was built by Hawthorn Leslie and Company on the Tyne. The vessel was launched on 19 July 1944 and commissioned on 27 September 1946.

Royal Navy service
When Saintes first commissioned in 1946 she joined the 5th Destroyer Flotilla and was used to trial the new 4.5-inch Mk 6 twin turret which became the standard destroyer main armament until well into the 1970s.

Saintes paid off on completion of the trials and was refitted with the conventional main armament of the class. In 1949, Saintes recommissioned into the 3rd Destroyer Flotilla and deployed to the Mediterranean where she took over as Captain (D)3, the senior officer in command of the flotilla.

In 1954, whilst still in the Mediterranean, Saintes came to the assistance of the merchant vessel , which had suffered an engine room explosion and fire whilst carrying troops and their families home from the Far East. Saintes took charge of the rescue operation and put fire and towing parties aboard and attempted to tow the ship to Gibraltar but Empire Windrush foundered whilst under tow. Apart from the four engine room staff killed in the original explosion all crew and passengers were rescued unharmed.

Saintes remained Captain of the 3rd Destroyer Squadron until she went for a major refit in 1956 at Rosyth when her crew transferred to her sister ship . On completion of her refit in 1958, Saintes again took over as Captain of the Squadron, this time as part of a General Service commission spending a part of the time with the Home Fleet and part of the time with the Mediterranean Fleet. In 1960, Saintes recommissioned with the 1st Destroyer Squadron, again having spells with the Home and Mediterranean Fleets.

Decommissioning and disposal
Saintes was paid off in May 1962 at Devonport. The ship was then towed to Rosyth by a towing crew of volunteers from her last commission. At Rosyth Saintes became the training ship for Artificer Apprentices from the shore establishment . Her armament was mothballed but her engines were maintained in full working order by the trainees. Saintes was broken up at Cairn Ryan in 1972.

References

Publications
 
 
 

 

Battle-class destroyers of the Royal Navy
Ships built on the River Tyne
1944 ships
Cold War destroyers of the United Kingdom